Filip Bainović (born 23 June 1996) is a Serbian footballer who plays as a defensive midfielder in Fortuna Liga for AS Trenčín.

Club career

Rad
Born in Požarevac, Bainović passed youth academy of football club Rad. As a member of generation which win the Serbian youth league for the 2014–15 season, Bainović joined the first team in summer 2015. He made his Serbian SuperLiga debut on 1 August 2015 in 4–1 home victory over Radnik Surdulica, when he also made an assist for a goal. He signed his first three-year professional contract with Rad on 11 September 2015. During the season, Bainović capped in the UEFA Youth League.

Shortly after he became fully pro, Bainović moved on dual registration to the satellite club Žarkovo. Playing for reserves, Bainović collected 43 appearances with 9 goals at total, including 37 appearances with 9 goals in the Serbian League Belgrade and 3 matches in the Serbian Cup. He also noted 3 games in Belgrade cup against Stepojevac Vaga, Dorćol and Brodarac 1947 after which he won the competition. He captained Žarkovo in his second season with the team.

Returning to the first squad, Bainović scored his first goal for Rad in the Serbian SuperLiga in 1–1 draw to Javor Ivanjica on 4 March 2017 from direct free kick. In August 2017, Bainović renewed his contract with Rad until 2020. At the beginning of 2018, Bainović moved back to Rad as a loaned player until the end of the 2017–18 Serbian SuperLiga campaign.

Red Star Belgrade
On 23 August 2017, Bainović signed with Red Star Belgrade on a three-year deal. Bainović made his debut for new club, replacing Uroš Račić in 65th minute of the Serbian Cup match against Dinamo Vranje, played on 11 October 2017.

International career
In November 2014, Bainović had been invited to the Serbia national under-19 football team by coach Ivan Tomić. Bainović appeared as a member of the team until 2015. In early 2017, Bainović was called into the Serbian under-20 level by coaches Ilija Petković and Milan Obradović.

Style of play
As a right-footed player, Bainović mainly operates as a defensive midfielder, being capable of playing as a central midfielder with possibility to take box-to-box role. He can also play as a central defender in some occasions. Bainović is characterized by leadership and captaincy.

Career statistics

Club

References

External links
 Filip Bainović stats at utakmica.rs
 
 
 
 

1996 births
Living people
Sportspeople from Požarevac
Association football midfielders
Serbian footballers
Serbian expatriate footballers
Serbia youth international footballers
FK Rad players
Red Star Belgrade footballers
Górnik Zabrze players
FK Radnik Surdulica players
AS Trenčín players
Serbian SuperLiga players
Ekstraklasa players
III liga players
Slovak Super Liga players
Expatriate footballers in Poland
Serbian expatriate sportspeople in Poland
Expatriate footballers in Slovakia
Serbian expatriate sportspeople in Slovakia